Salumäe is a village in Anija Parish, Harju County in northern Estonia. It has a population of 67 (as of 1 January 2010).

References

Villages in Harju County